The 1170 class were a class of diesel locomotive built by Walkers Limited, Maryborough for Queensland Railways between 1956 and 1958.

History
The 1170 class were intended as a replacement for the PB15 class steam locomotives on branch lines. They were built by Walkers Limited in Maryborough under licence from GE Transportation.

They were originally known as the 1500 class and renumbered as the 1270 class (not to be confused with the later 1270 class) before finally being renumbered as the 1170 class.

The class were popularly known as 'Paw Paws' after a racehorse, which in turn was named after a character in a contemporary cartoon strip.

They spent most of their working lives based at Townsville but in later years were used around Brisbane and the southern region of the state as shunters. The first unit was withdrawn in 1984 with the final two withdrawn in 1989.

Five units have been preserved, including class leader 1170 retained by the Queensland Rail Heritage Division at North Ipswich.

Status table

References

A1A-A1A locomotives
Diesel locomotives of Queensland
Queensland Rail locomotives
Railway locomotives introduced in 1956
Walkers Limited locomotives
Diesel-electric locomotives of Australia